Camarotoscena is a genus of true bugs belonging to the family Liviidae.

The genus was first described by Haupt in 1935.

The species of this genus are found in Europe.

Species:
 Camarotoscena speciosa (Flor, 1861)

References

Hemiptera
Hemiptera genera
Liviidae